The Dialog K35 is a dual-SIM slate smartphone that runs on the Android operating system. It is designed and developed in China by Innos and marketed in Sri Lanka by Dialog Axiata. It has a 1 GHz Broadcom CPU with 512 MB of RAM. This handset has a 320x480 pixels 3.5 inch IPS QHD Capacitive display. This device has a 4 GB internal storage and also supports micro-SD card up to 32 GB.  This device can work using networks including GPRS, EDGE, and 3G. It has Wi-Fi, Bluetooth, and USB connectivity. This device can also be use as a Wi-Fi hotspot. Dialog K35 has a 3.2 megapixel rear camera with dual LED flash and a 0.3 megapixel front-facing camera for video calls. The device was launched with Android 4.0.4 Ice Cream Sandwich.

References

External links
 Dialog K35

Android (operating system) devices